"Bridal Train" is a single by the Australian folk-rock band The Waifs, coming from their album A Brief History.... Bridal Train was written by Vikki Thorn.
The song is about the bride trains that ran from Perth to Sydney and Brisbane in 1945 and 1946 to allow Australian war brides to join their husbands in the United States.

In Australia, the song was ranked #54 on Triple J's Hottest 100 of 2004.

The song Bridal Train won the first prize in the 'Folk' category, as well as the overall first prize, in the 2006 USA Songwriting Competition.

Synopsis
In a 2007 interview with Andrew Denton, Vikki Thorn explained the song:

Track listing
 Bridal Train  
 Strings Of Steel  
 Sweetness (Live)

Charts

References

The Waifs albums
2004 EPs
Songs about trains